The Australia cricket team toured South Africa from October 1957 to March 1958 and played a five-match Test series against the South Africa national cricket team. Australia won the Test series 3–0. Australia were captained by Ian Craig; South Africa by Clive van Ryneveld.

Australian team 

 Ian Craig (captain)
 Richie Benaud
 Peter Burge
 Jim Burke
 Alan Davidson
 John Drennan
 Les Favell
 Ron Gaunt
 Wally Grout
 Neil Harvey
 Barry Jarman
 Lindsay Kline
 Ken Mackay
 Colin McDonald
 Ian Meckiff
 Bob Simpson

Gaunt was not in the original team, but joined in early January 1958 as a reinforcement when Drennan was injured.

Test series summary

First Test

Second Test

Third Test

Fourth Test

Fifth Test

References

External links
 Australia in South Africa 1957-58 at CricketArchive
 Test Cricket Tours - Australia to South Africa 1957-58 at Test Cricket Tours

1957 in Australian cricket
1957 in South African cricket
1958 in Australian cricket
1958 in South African cricket
International cricket competitions from 1945–46 to 1960
1957
South African cricket seasons from 1945–46 to 1969–70